is a Japanese rugby sevens player. He was in 's team for the 2014 Asian Games in Incheon, South Korea; he scored one of two tries to help Japan win gold.

References

External links
 JRFU Player Profile
 

1991 births
Living people
People from Aichi Prefecture
People from Nagoya
Sportspeople from Aichi Prefecture
Sportspeople from Nagoya
Male rugby sevens players
Rugby sevens players at the 2016 Summer Olympics
Olympic rugby sevens players of Japan
Japanese rugby sevens players
Japanese rugby union players
Rugby union players at the 2014 Asian Games
Japan international rugby union players
Asian Games medalists in rugby union
Urayasu D-Rocks players
Asian Games gold medalists for Japan
Medalists at the 2014 Asian Games
Japan international rugby sevens players
Rugby sevens players at the 2020 Summer Olympics
Sunwolves players
Rugby union wings
Rugby union fullbacks